This article lists the oldest extant freestanding buildings in the United Kingdom. In order to qualify for the list a structure must:
 be a recognisable building
 either incorporate features of building work from the claimed date to at least  in height and/or be a listed building.
 incorporate features of building work of the above nature that date from no later than 1300 AD.
Roads are excluded although other structures such as bridges may be included if they otherwise fulfil the above criteria.

Before 500 BC

500 BC to 500 AD

500 AD to 1000 AD

11th century

12th century

13th century

Ancient chapel of St.Andrew, Maghull, Merseyside. Built in 13th Century.  Grade II* listed.

See also
 List of oldest known surviving buildings in the world
 Hillforts in Britain:
List of hillforts in England
List of hillforts in Scotland
List of hillforts in Wales
 Newgrange, one of Ireland's oldest buildings dating from c. 3100 BC
 La Hougue Bie, one of Jersey's oldest buildings dating from c. 3500 BC
 Timeline of prehistoric Scotland

References

Sources

 

Lists of buildings and structures in the United Kingdom
United Kingdom
Buildings